Linepithema inacatum is a species of ant in the genus Linepithema. Described by Bolton in 1995, the species is endemic to Argentina and Brazil.

References

Dolichoderinae
Hymenoptera of South America
Insects described in 1995